Roman Denisovich Tkachuk (August 31, 1932 — January 10, 1994) was a Soviet theatre and film actor.

Biography
He was born on August 31, 1932 in Sverdlovsk (now Yekaterinburg), USSR.

He graduated from the Film and Theatre Institute named after Aleksandr Ostrovsky in Tashkent in 1955.

In late 1993, Tkachuk's wife, actress Maya Gnezdovskaya became seriously ill. On January 9, 1994 she was taken home from the hospital, and on the night of January 10, she died. The actor outlived her for only a few hours. He was buried with his wife in the Dolgoprudnenskoe (Central) Cemetery.

Filmography

Awards
 People's Artist of the Uzbek SSR (1964)
 Order of the Badge of Honour (1972)
 Honored Worker of Culture of Poland (1976)
Stanislavsky State Prize (1977)

References

External links

Soviet male film actors
1932 births
Actors from Yekaterinburg
1994 deaths
Russian male film actors
Soviet male television actors
Russian male television actors
Soviet male stage actors
Russian male stage actors